118 also known as (要要发) ran for 255 episodes and was produced by Mediacorp Channel 8. It stars Chew Chor Meng, Pan Lingling, Dennis Chew, Ya Hui, Xu Bin and Somaline Ang as the casts of this series.

The show replaced the second half of the 7.00 pm drama timeslot, airing weekdays from 20 October 2014, 7.30 pm to 8.00 pm on weekdays making the 1st long form half an hour drama airing together with news-current affairs programme Hello Singapore at 6.30pm. It is the longest running Chinese drama produced by Mediacorp.

Plot
Hong Daming (Chew Chor Meng) is a positive and generous man. As his coffee shop and house number are both "118", the people around him gave him the nickname of "118" (or 要要发), much to his delight. Together with his wife, Liu Meimei (Pan Lingling), he makes a living by running the coffee-shop, and are well known in Tiong Bahru. Whenever someone is in need, they would always seek Daming for help.

His family lives in a 3-room flat, which was built in pre-war years, above the coffee shop. He has 4 children. The children are named Hong Shunfeng (Dennis Chew), Hong Shunshui (Xu Bin), Hong Jinzhi (Ya Hui) and Hong Yuye (Somaline Ang).

Having 6 people living in a 3-room flat is cramped-up enough, yet he also rents out a room to "Ah Niang", a middle-aged man whose original name is Li Weiliang (Chen Hanwei). Weiliang studied fashion design in France, but circumstances led him to simply run a stall in 118's coffee-shop, selling dumplings with the recipe that his mother left for him.

Weiliang was not the only addition to the cramped flat. Later, Meimei's elder sister – Liu Jiejie (Liu Lingling) and her family also came to live with 118 when her husband, Zhang Tiancheng's (Chen Tianwen)'s business failed. Daming's own younger sister, Hong Shanshan (Sheila Sim), and her daughter also came to live with him "temporarily" when her husband disappeared mysteriously. Kind-hearted by nature, Daming felt that they must have come to him because they were at their wit's end. He would rather make room for them by having his own sons sleep in the living room, than to chase them away heartlessly.

As such, the story unfolds with this myriad of personalities living under the same roof and hanging around the 118 coffee-shop, where many dramatic yet comedic events took place...

"118" presents the positive side of a Singaporean – passionate, practical, caring, resilient, faithful, tolerant and forward-looking – while also touching on the lesser side of our personalities. Through the dramatic play of events, we are able to see ourselves in the many characters, who are in fact a mirror of the good and bad sides of all of us.

Cast

Hong (Daming) family

Zhang (Tiancheng) family

Hong (Shanshan) family

Lin (Zhigao) family

Li (Chengfeng) family

Li (Zhihao) family

Chen (Meizhen) family

Zhang (Jiabao) family

Zhang (Meiyou) family

 Roy Li 黎沸挥 as Zhang Meiyou 张没友  Li portrays a former getai performer, Zhang Meiyou. His original name is Li Mingfa. Zhang's mother is Granny Egg. Zhang was Liu Meimei's former lover and the father of Hong Jinzhi. Initially the antagonist in the series, Zhang suffered from amnesia as a result from a struggle with a thief and come to terms with the Hong family. He subsequently regained his memories. He has various nicknames like Terence Cao (曹国辉), Unfilial son (不孝子), I'm a Good Man (我是好人), Li Nanxing (李南星).
 Ang Twa Bak 洪大目 as Granny Egg 鸡蛋婆  Ang portrays as Zhang's mother, Granny Egg, who sells eggs at the market. Granny Egg died after suffering a fall.

Other characters

Tiong Bahru Market / Food Centre

 Jim Koh 许晋鸣 as Seventh Duke 七公子Koh portrays as a fishmonger
 Zheng Yiqin 郑逸钦 as Uncle Cabbage 菜心叔Zheng portrays as a vegetable seller.
 Cat Ang 翁慧霖 as Sister Blossom 花姐Ang portrays as a florist whose flower shop closed down and subsequently works at Pizza @ 119
 Theresa Cai Yunjun 蔡韵君 as Auntie Fruit 水果嫂Cai portrays as a fruit seller.
 Tang Shaowei 唐绍炜 as Ah Qing 阿清Tang portrays a migrant worker from China who works as a cleaner at the market.
 He Bin 何滨 as Auntie Bun 包嫂He portrays a stallowner selling chwee kueh and buns at the food centre

Cameo appearance (appearing from ep 1-127)
Note: Only credited cameos are listed.

Cameo appearance (appearing from ep 128 onwards)
Note: Only credited cameos and notable cast are listed.

Cast who left before episode 127

Original Sound Track (OST)

Production
The storyboard for the series, Ang Eng Tee, said in an interview with My Paper that the show may need to be re-scripted even after the script for all 255 episodes has finished writing. This is because speculations that the general elections may be held in 2015 is trending, and that the political parties are already introducing its candidates progressively. If the elections are held in September, the show will need to re-insert the GE buzz, and the director and cast will need to do re-takes. The election dates were announced on 25 August, and the GE buzz was inserted on episode 225 (7 September 2015), where Dennis Chew and Sheila Sim mentioned the election campaigns. However, as the show was pre-empted six times during that period, episode 225 could have been aired on 28 August if there were no interruptions, causing the campaigning period, which were held on 2 to 9 September, to have happened earlier than usual.

Reception 
In 2016, the Media Development Authority (MDA) of Singapore criticised the drama having advertorial segments shown before the programme's end credits. The segments showed actors from the drama advocating sponsors' products on the same set for the drama. However MDA also praised the drama for its "down-to-earth depictions of social issues" and "celebration of the Singaporean identity".

Awards & Nominations

Star Awards 2016
118 has the third-most number of nominations for Star Awards 2016, with 11 nominations in 10 award categories. The series has at least one nomination in every performance award for drama programmes. Along with Crescendo, The Dream Makers II, The Journey: Our Homeland and Tiger Mum, it is one of the five dramas to be nominated for both the Best Drama Serial and Best Theme Song. It won 2 out of 10 award categories.

References

Singapore Chinese dramas
2014 Singaporean television series debuts
2015 Singaporean television series endings
Channel 8 (Singapore) original programming